Xyroptila maklaia is a moth of the family Pterophoridae. It is found in northern New Guinea.

References

External links

Moths described in 2006
maklaia